The 2010–11 Lithuanian Hockey League season was the 20th season of the Lithuanian Hockey League. Sporto Centras Elektrenai won the championship for the second season in a row. The league was divided into A and B divisions. 10 teams participated in the A Division, and 17 teams played in the B Division. Bizonai Kaunas won the B Division.

Western Qualification

The top five teams qualified for Division A.

Division A

Regular season

Western Group

Central-Eastern Group

Playoffs

Qualification
LRK Kedainiai - Skatas-95 Klaipeda 13:2
Ledo Linija Siauliai - Vanvita Vilnius 2:10

Semifinals
Sadvita Klaipeda - LRK Kedainiai 1:10
Sporto Centras Elektrenai - Vanvita Vilnius 13:2

Final
Sporto Centras Elektrenai - LRK Kedainiai 5:3

3rd place game
Sadvita Klaipeda - Vanvita Vilnius 4:6

Division B

Regular season

Western Group

Central Group

Eastern Group

Playoffs

Qualification
Ice Wind Vilnius - Grifai Kretinga 7:5
Rest Turas Kaunas - Grifai Kretinga 2:4
Rest Turas Kaunas - Ice Wind Vilnius 0:2
Ice Wind Vilnius qualified for the semifinals.

Semifinals
Bizonai Kaunas - Ober-Haus Vilnius 5:4 OT
Olimpas Panevezys - Ice Wind Vilnius 0:4

Final
Bizonai Kaunas - Ice Wind Vilnius 3:2

3rd place
Olimpia Panevezys - Ober-Haus Vilnius 2:8

External links
Lithuanian Ice Hockey Federation
Season on hockeyarchives.info

Lithuanian Hockey League
Lithuania Hockey League seasons
Lith